HpaSaung  (MLCTS: hpaa.chaung.mrui) is a town in the Kayah State of eastern part of Burma.

Landmarks
Hpasaung Hydropower Station

Township capitals of Myanmar
Populated places in Kayah State